SUL or Sul may refer to:

 Sul (Korean surname)
 Surigaonon language (ISO 639 code sul)
 Stanford University Libraries
 Sul, a Dutch profanity

Places
 Sul, Fars, Iran
 Sul, Hormozgan, Iran
 South Region, Brazil

See also 
 Sulis

Sports Utility Limousine